Cuxhaven is a railway station located in Cuxhaven, Germany. The station is located on the Lower Elbe Railway and Bremerhaven–Cuxhaven railway. The Cuxhaven-Bremerhaven service is operated by EVB. The Cuxhaven to Hamburg service, which was operated by Deutsche Bahn, became a Metronom service at the end of 2007. In December 2018, Start Unterelbe GmbH, a subsidiary of Deutsche Bahn, took over the service. Today the station building is owned by a cooperative.

Train services
The following services currently call at the station:

Regional services  Cuxhaven - Stade - Buxtehude - Hamburg
Local services  Cuxhaven - Dorum - Bremerhaven - Bremervörde - Buxtehude

References

External links
 
 Cooperative Bürgerbahnhof Cuxhaven

Station
Railway stations in Lower Saxony
Buildings and structures in Cuxhaven (district)
Railway stations in Germany opened in 1881
Buildings and structures completed in 1898